El Equipo (The Team) is a Mexican series starring Alfonso Herrera, Zuria Vega, Alberto Estrella and Fabián Robles are the protagonists. Is a series that blends action, drama, love, and shows the work and effort of the Mexican federal police, who every day risk their lives to protect society against mafias and drug cartels. The story centers around Santiago, Fermin, Magda and Mateo, who at one time in his life made the decision to become a Federal Police officer. In each chapter, the team will solve a different case where we can see the intelligence process, the operation and the capture of the offender while the characters must face their feelings and solve their own problems of everyday life. A blockbuster inspired by real events, produced by Pedro Torres and directed by Carlos Garcia Agraz and Chava Cartas.

Cast
Alberto Estrella as Santiago Quiron, Team Policia Federal
Alfonso Herrera as Fermin Perez, Team Policia Federal
Zuria Vega as Magda Saenz, Team Policia Federal
Fabián Robles as Mateo Acona, Team Policia Federal
Roberto Blandon as El Jefe Sigma, police chief of Policia Federal, killed in line of duty. +
Marisol del Olmo as Natalia
Flavio Medina as Elisha Raya
Adanely Núñez as Lucila
Claudia Alvarez as Pilar
Manuel Ojeda
Mario Casillas as El Deme
Luis Couturier as Don Lorenzo
Luis Uribe as Carlos Raúl Quinzaños
Juan Carlos Barreto as El Vale
Ramon Valdez as Fernandez, Team Policia Federal
Arturo Posada as Otero, Team Policia Federal
Marco Uriel as El Mister
José Montini as "Gordo Palette"

2011 Mexican television series debuts
Mexican telenovelas
Spanish-language telenovelas
Works about Mexican drug cartels